The following is a list of Mac software – notable computer applications for current macOS operating systems.

For software designed for the classic Mac OS, see List of old Macintosh software.

Audio software

Digital audio workstations 

Ableton Live
Ardour
Cubase
Digital Performer
GarageBand
Logic Pro and MainStage
REAPER
Reason
Renoise
Steinberg 2019 Mac Pro

Audio editing 

 Audacity – digital audio editor

DJing 

 djay – digital music mixing software
 Mixxx – DJ mix software

Notation software 

 Impro-Visor
 Finale
 LilyPond
 Overture

Misc audio tools 

 Audio Hijack – audio recorder
 baudline – signal analyzer
 Cog – open source audio player, supports multiple formats
 fre:ac – open source audio converter and CD ripper
 ixi software – free improvisation and sketching tools
 Jaikoz – music file mass tagger
 Max – Cycling 74's visual programming language for MIDI, audio, video; with MSP, Jitter
 ReBirth – virtual synth program simulates Roland TR-808, TB-303
 Recycle – music loop editor

Discontinued audio apps 

 Adobe Soundbooth – music and soundtrack editing
 Audion – media player
 BIAS Peak – mastering
 iTunes – audio/video Jukebox by Apple
 Logic Express – prosumer music production by Apple
 Logic Studio – music writing studio package by Apple
 Apple Loops Utility – production and organisation of Apple Loops
 Apple Qmaster and Qadministrator
 Mainstage – program to play software synthesizers live
 QuickTime Pro – pro version of QuickTime
 Soundtrack Pro – post production audio editor
 WaveBurner – CD mastering and production software
 RiffWorks – guitar recording and online song collaboration software

Chat (text, voice, image, video)

Active

Adium – multi-protocol IM client
aMSN
ChitChat
Colloquy – freeware advanced IRC and SILC client
Discord
Fire – open source, multiprotocol IM client
FaceTime – videoconferencing between Mac, iPhone, iPad and iPod Touch
iMessage – instant messaging between Mac, and iDevices 
Ircle
Irssi – IrssiX and MacIrssi
Kopete
LiveChat
Microsoft Messenger for Mac
Microsoft Teams
Palringo
Psi (instant messenger)
Skype
Snak
Ventrilo – audio chatroom application
X-Chat Aqua
Yahoo! Messenger
Telegram

Discontinued

AOL Instant Messenger – discontinued as of December 15, 2017
Miiverse - discontinued as of November 7, 2017
iChat – instant messaging and videoconferencing (discontinued since OS X 10.8 Mountain Lion in favor of FaceTime and iMessage)

Children's software
Kid Pix Deluxe 3X – bitmap drawing program 
Stagecast Creator – programming and internet authoring for kids

Developer tools and IDEs
 
Apache Web Server
AppCode – an Objective-C IDE by JetBrains for macOS and iOS development
Aptana – an open source integrated development environment (IDE) for building Ajax web applications
Clozure CL – an open source integrated development environment (IDE) for building Common Lisp applications
Code::Blocks – open source IDE for C++
CodeWarrior – development environment, framework
Coldstone game engine
Dylan
Eclipse – open source Java-based IDE for developing rich-client applications, includes SWT library, replaces Swing by using underlying OS native windowing abilities
Fink – Debian package manager for ported Unix software
Free Pascal – Object Pascal compiler, XCode plugin available
GNU Compiler Collection
Glasgow Haskell Compiler
Helix – relational database IDE
Homebrew - Package manager for installing many open source, mostly terminal based, utilities. Includes Apache, PHP, Python and many more.
HotSpot – Sun's Java Virtual Machine
IntelliJ IDEA – a JAVA IDE by JetBrains (free limited community edition)
Komodo – commercial multi-language IDE from ActiveState
Lazarus – cross-platform IDE to develop software with Free Pascal, specialized in graphical software
LiveCode – high-level cross-platform IDE
MacApp – application development framework Pascal and C++
Macintosh Programmer's Workshop (MPW)
Macports – a package management system that simplifies the installation of free/open source software on the macOS. 
Macromedia Authorware – application (CBT, eLearning) development, no Mac development environment since version 4, though can still package applications with the 'Mac Packager' for OS 8 through 10 playback
Mono – open source implementation of Microsoft .NET Framework with a C# compiler
NetBeans – modular, open source, multi-language platform and IDE for Java written in pure Java
Omnis Studio – cross-platform development environment for creating enterprise and web applications for macOS, Windows, Linux, Solaris
Panorama
Perl
PHP
Python
Qt Creator – an IDE for C++ GUI applications, by Trolltech
Real Studio – cross-platform compiled REALbasic BASIC programming language IDE
ResEdit – resource editor
Script Debugger – an AppleScript and Open Scripting Architecture IDE
SuperCard – high-level IDE
Tcl/tk – scripting shell & GUI utility that allows cross platform development. Included with macOS.
TextMate – multipurpose text editor that supports Ruby, PHP, and Python
Torque (game engine) – game creation software
WebKit – open source application framework for Safari (web browser)
WebObjects
wxPython – API merging Python and wxWidgets
Xcode – IDE made by Apple, which comes as a part of macOS and is available as a downloadon, was called Project Builders of Florida tech

Email

Email clients
Apple Mail – the bundled email client
Claris Emailer – classic Mac OS only, no longer available
Entourage – email client by Microsoft; analogous to Microsoft Outlook
Eudora
Foxmail
Lotus Notes
Mailbird
Mailplane – a WebKit-based client for Gmail
Microsoft Outlook 
Mozilla Thunderbird
Mulberry – open-source software for e-mail, calendars and contacts
Opera Mail
Outlook Express
Postbox
Sparrow – as well as Sparrow Lite

Other email software
Gmail Notifier

FTP clients
Classic FTP
Cyberduck
Fetch
Fugu
FileZilla
ForkLift
Interarchy
Transmit
WebDrive – FTP and cloud client
Yummy FTP

Games

Steam – digital distribution software for video games and related media

Graphics, layout, desktop publishing

CAD, 3D graphics
3D-Coat
Autodesk Alias
Ashlar-Vellum – 2D/3D drafting, 3D modeling
ArchiCAD
AutoCAD
Blender
BricsCAD
Cheetah3D
Cinema 4D
SketchUp – 3D modeling software
Houdini
Lightwave
Maya
Modo
PowerCADD
ZBrush

Distributed document authoring
Adobe Acrobat
Preview

Icon editors, viewers
Icon Composer – part of Apple Developer Tools
IconBuilder
Microsoft Office

File conversion and management

Active
Adobe Bridge – digital asset management app
BibDesk – free bibliographic database app that organizes linked files
Font Book – font management tool
GraphicConverter – graphics editor, open/converts a wide range of file formats
Photos – photo management application

Discontinued
iPhoto – discontinued photo management application

Layout and desktop publishing

Active
Adobe InDesign – page layout
iCalamus – page layout
iStudio Publisher – page layout
Pages – part of iWork
QuarkXPress – page layout
Ready, Set, Go! – page layout
Scribus – page layout
TeX – publishing
MacTeX – TeX redistribution of TeX Live for Mac
Comparison of TeX Editors
The Print Shop – page layout

Discontinued
iBooks Author – created interactive books for Apple Books

Raster and vector graphics
This section lists bitmap graphics editors and vector graphics editors.

Active
Adobe Fireworks – supports GIF animation
Adobe Illustrator – vector graphics editor
Adobe Photoshop – also offers some vector graphics features
Affinity Designer – vector graphics editor for Apple macOS and Microsoft Windows
Anime Studio – 2D based vector animation
Collabora Online - enterprise-ready edition of LibreOffice
Corel Painter
EazyDraw – vector graphics editor; versions available that can convert old formats such as MacDraw files
Fontographer
GIMP – free bitmap graphics editor
GIMPShop – free open source cross-platform bitmap graphics editor
GraphicConverter – displays and edits raster graphics files
Inkscape – free vector graphics editor
Luminar
Macromedia FreeHand – vector graphics editor
Paintbrush – free simple bitmap graphics program
Photos – official photo management and editing application developed by Apple
Photo Booth – photo camera, video recorder
Pixelmator – hardware-accelerated integrated photo editor
Polarr – photo editing app
Seashore – open source, based around the GIMP's technology, but with native macOS (Cocoa) UI

Discontinued
Aperture – Apple's pro photo management, editing, publishing application
MacPaint – painting software by Apple (discontinued)

Integrated software technologies 

Finder
QuickTime
Terminal
X11.app

Language and reference tools
Cram (software)
Dictionary (software)
Encyclopædia Britannica
Rosetta Stone (software) – proprietary language learning software
Ultralingua – proprietary electronic dictionaries and language tools
World Book Encyclopedia – multimedia

Mathematics software
Fityk
Grapher
Maple (software)
Mathematica
MATLAB
MathMagic
Octave (software) – open source
R (programming language)
Sysquake
SciLab – open source

Media center
Boxee – Mac and Apple TV
Front Row
Mira
MythTV
SageTV
Plex
Kodi

Multimedia authoring
Adobe Director – animation/application development
Adobe Flash – vector animation
Adobe LiveMotion – a discontinued competitor to Flash, until Adobe bought Macromedia
Apple Media Tool – a discontinued multimedia authoring tool published by Apple
Dragonframe - stop motion animation and time-lapse
iBooks Author – created interactive books for Apple Books (discontinued)
iLife – media suite by Apple
Unity – 3D authoring

Networking and telecommunications
Apple Remote Desktop
Google Earth
iStumbler – find wireless networks and devices 
Karelia Watson (defunct)
KisMAC
Little Snitch – network monitor and outgoing connection firewall
NetSpot – software tool for wireless network assessment, scanning, and surveys, analyzing Wi-Fi coverage and performance
Timbuktu – remote control
WiFi Explorer – a wireless network scanner tool

News aggregators

Feedly – news aggregator, and news aggregator reading application
NetNewsWire – news aggregator reading application
NewsFire – news aggregator reading application
RSSOwl – news aggregator reading application
Safari (web browser) - news aggregation via built-in RSS support
Apple Mail – news aggregation via (discontinued) built-in RSS support

Office and productivity
AbiWord
Adobe Acrobat
Address Book – bundled with macOS
AppleWorks – word processor, spreadsheet, and presentation applications (discontinued)
Banktivity – personal finance, budgeting, investments
Bean (word processor) – free TXT/RTF/DOC word processor
Celtx
Collabora Online enterprise-ready edition of LibreOffice
CricketGraph – graphmaker
Delicious Library
FileMaker
FlowVella
Fortora Fresh Finance
Helix (database)
iBank – personal finance applicatio
iCal – calendar management, bundled with macOS
iWork – suite:
Pages – word processor application
Numbers – spreadsheet application
Keynote – presentation application
Journler – diary and personal information manager with personal wiki features
KOffice
LibreOffice
MacLinkPlus Deluxe – file format translation tool for PowerPC-era Mac OS X, converting and opening files created in other operating systems 
Mellel
Microsoft Office – office suite:
Microsoft Word – word processor application
Microsoft Excel – spreadsheet application
Microsoft PowerPoint – presentation application
Microsoft Entourage – email application (replaced by Microsoft Outlook)
Microsoft Outlook – email application
Microsoft OneNote – note-taking application
MoneyWiz – personal finance application
Montage – screenwriting software
NeoOffice
Nisus Writer
OmniFocus
OpenOffice.org
WriteNow
Taste – word processor (discontinued)

Operating systems

Darwin – the BSD-licensed core of macOS
macOS – originally named "Mac OS X" until 2012 and then "OS X" until 2016
macOS Server – the server computing variant of macOS

Outliners and mind-mapping
FreeMind
Mindjet
OmniOutliner
OmniGraffle
XMind

Peer-to-peer file sharing
aMule
BitTorrent client
FrostWire
LimeWire
Poisoned
rTorrent
Transmission (BitTorrent)
μTorrent
Vuze – Bittorrent client, was Azureus

Science
Celestia – 3D astronomy program
SimThyr – Simulation system for thyroid homeostasis
Stellarium – 3D astronomy program

Text editors

ACE
BBEdit
BBEdit Lite
Coda
Emacs
jEdit
iA Writer
Komodo Edit
Nano
SimpleText
Smultron
SubEthaEdit
TeachText
TextEdit
TextMate
TextWrangler
vim
XEmacs
Ulysses

Utilities
Activity Monitor – default system monitor for hardware and software
AppZapper – uninstaller (shareware)
Automator – built-in, utility to automate repetitive tasks
Butler – free, launcher and utility to automate repetitive tasks
CleanGenius – free system optimization tool for macOS, disk cleaner, uninstaller, device ejector, disk monitor. (freeware)
CandyBar – system customization software (commercial)
CDFinder – disk cataloging software (commercial)
DaisyDisk – disk visualization tool
Dashboard – built-in macOS widgets
Grab (software) – built-in macOS screenshot utility
Growl – global notifications system, free
iSync – syncing software, bundled with Mac OS X up to 10.6
LaunchBar – provides instant access to local data, search engines and more by entering abbreviations of search item names, commercial
Mavis Beacon Teaches Typing – proprietary, typing tutor
OnyX – a freeware system maintenance and optimization tool for macOS
Path Finder – replacement for Apple's Finder
Quicksilver – a framework for accessing and manipulating many forms of data
SheepShaver – PowerPC emulator, allows, among other things, running Mac OS 9 on Intel Macs
Sherlock – file searching (version 2), web services (version 3)
Stickies – put Post-It Note-like notes on the desktop
System Settings – default Mac system option application
UUTool – uuencoded/uudecode and other transcoding
Xsan – storage network utility
Yahoo! Widget Engine – JavaScript-based widget system

Anti-malware software 
macOS includes the built-in XProtect antimalware as part of GateKeeper.
The software listed in this section is antivirus software and malware removal software.
BitDefender Antivirus for Mac – antivirus
Intego VirusBarrier – antivirus
MacScan – malware removal
Malwarebytes — malware removal
McAffee VirusScan – antivirus
Norton Antivirus for Mac – antivirus
Sophos – antivirus

Archiving, backup, restore, recovery 
This section lists software for file archiving, backup and restore, data compression and data recovery.
 Archive Utility – built-in archive file handler
Archiver – paid, file archiving
BetterZip – file archiver and compressor
 Compact Pro – data compression
Disk Drill  – data recovery
Stellar Data Recovery – data recovery
The Unarchiver — file archiving
Time Machine (macOS) – built-in backup software
WinZip – file archiver and compressor utility

Discontinued archiving apps 
 Backup – discontinued Apple backup utility, part of MobileMe
 Stuffit – data compression

Disc burning apps 
 Roxio Toast – DVD authoring application

Discontinued disc burning apps 
 Adobe Encore
 Disco – disc burning
 DVD Studio Pro – DVD authoring application
 iDVD – a basic DVD-authoring application

Video
Adobe After Effects
Adobe Premiere Pro
Adobe Presenter Video Express
ArKaos – VJ software
Avid
DaVinci Resolve – Video Editing Suite
DivX
DivX Player
DVD Player (Apple) – DVD player software built into macOS
FFmpeg – audio/video converter
Final Cut Express
Final Cut Studio – audio-video editing suite:
Apple Qmaster
Cinema Tools
Compressor
DVD Studio Pro
Final Cut Pro
LiveType
Motion 2
Soundtrack Pro
HandBrake – DVD to MPEG-4 and other formats converter
iMovie – basic video editing application
Miro Media Player
MPlayer
Perian
QuickTime – including its Player and QuickTime Pro
RealPlayer
Shotcut - An open source rich video editor
Shake
Windows Media Player
VLC media player

Virtualization, emulation, dual-booting 
Bochs
Boot Camp – a multi-boot utility built into macOS from 10.5
CrossOver – commercial implementation of Wine
DOSBox – DOS emulator
Hercules emulator
pcAnywhere – VNC-style remote control
Parallels Workstation – commercial full virtualization software for desktop and server
Q – emulates an IBM-compatible PC on a Mac, allows running PC operating systems
VMware Fusion – virtualization software
Wine – Windows API reimplementation
Virtual PC – full virtualization software allows running other operating systems, such as Windows and Linux, on PowerPC Macs (discontinued in 2007)
VirtualBox
vMac – emulates a Macintosh Plus and can run Apple Macintosh System versions 1.1 to 7.5.5.

Web browsers

Amaya – free
Camino – open source
Flock – free, Mozilla Firefox based
Google Chrome – free,  proprietary
iCab – free
Konqueror – open source
Lynx – free
Mozilla – open source, combines browser, email client, WYSIWYG editor
Mozilla Firefox – open source
Microsoft Edge  – free
Netscape Navigator – free,  proprietary
OmniWeb – free,  proprietary
Opera – free
Safari (web browser) – built-in from Mac OS X 10.3, available as a separate download for Mac OS X 10.2
SeaMonkey – open source Internet application suite
Shiira – open source
Sleipnir – free, by Fenrir Inc
Tor (anonymity network) – free, open source
Torch (web browser) – free, by Torch Media Inc.
Internet Explorer for Mac – free, by Microsoft
WebKit – Safari application framework, also in the form of an application

Web design and content management
Adobe Contribute
Adobe Dreamweaver
Adobe GoLive
Claris Homepage
Coda
Freeway
iWeb
NVu
RapidWeaver – a template-based website editor

Weblog clients
ecto
MarsEdit

See also
List of Macintosh software published by Microsoft
List of Unix commands

References

List of Macintosh software
Macintosh